Harvey Smith (born 1966) is an American video game designer and writer, working at Arkane Studios.

Smith has lectured in various places around the world on topics such as level design, emergent gameplay, leadership, game unit differentiation, future trends and interactive narrative.  At the Game Developers Conference in 2006, Smith won the Game Designer's Challenge: Nobel Peace Prize, for his design featuring a mobile video game that facilitates political social action.

Early life
Smith was born and raised on the Texas Gulf Coast. He grew up playing games like Pong as well as Dungeons & Dragons. He read books by Ursula K. Le Guin, William Faulkner, Vladimir Nabokov and Roger Zelazny, among others. After six years in the U.S. Air Force, Smith moved to Austin at the behest of a friend to try his hand at video game design.

Career
Early in his career, Smith worked in quality assurance (QA) at the Austin-based Origin Systems, where he became the QA lead for games including Super Wing Commander and System Shock. In 1995, Smith became an associate producer for Ultima VIII, working with co-founder of Origin, Richard Garriott. Smith then pitched his own game, Technosaur, a real time strategy game inspired by Dune that would have featured "cybernetically augmented velociraptors". The project was cancelled by publisher Electronic Arts after 18 months of work.

After leaving Origin in 1996, Harvey Smith went to work at Multitude where they released FireTeam.

After Multitude, Smith's game development career continued in Austin, Texas working with Warren Spector at Ion Storm as lead designer on Deus Ex as well as its sequel, Deus Ex: Invisible War. After this he unsuccessfully pitched a further game in the Thief series, to be called Thief: Modern, in which central character Garrett lived in modern-day New York.

Smith then left Ion Storm to work at Midway Games, originally to work on a title called Criminal with "immersive sim values" inspired by Michael Mann's 1995 crime film Heat, but shifting ultimately to work as lead designer on BlackSite: Area 51. On November 29, 2007, Smith came out publicly to announce how unrealistic the BlackSite: Area 51's development schedule was and through mutual agreement left Midway a day later. He claimed the schedule caused the low reviews due to the fact they were not able to test the game properly. 
 
In 2008, Smith became partner and co-creative director of Arkane Studios in Austin alongside the company's president, Raphaël Colantonio. They went on to release the stealth-action game Dishonored in 2012, which won many Game of the Year and Best Action/Adventure accolades including the 2013 BAFTA award for Best Game and 2012 SPIKE VGA for Best Action/Adventure Game. Smith also co-directed the sequel Dishonored 2 and its standalone expansion Dishonored: Death of the Outsider. Smith is co-director on Arkane Austin's Redfall, an open-world first person shooter, due for release in May 2023.

Smith's semi-autobiographical novel, Big Jack is Dead, was released on April 2, 2013, by CreateSpace Independent Publishing Platform. That same year it was on Kirkus Review's list of "Best Indie General Fiction".

Works

Video games

Book

References

External links
witchboy.net, Smith's personal website
Harvey Smith at Twitter

Harvey Smith interview at DPerry.com

1966 births
American video game designers
American video game directors
Artists from Austin, Texas
Creative directors
Living people
Origin Systems people
Place of birth missing (living people)
United States Air Force airmen
Video game writers
ZeniMax Media